The West Ada School District #2, long known as the Meridian School District, is a school district based in Meridian, Idaho. In addition to Meridian, the district operates public schools in Eagle, Star and western Boise. It is the largest school district in Idaho.

In June 2014, the district board of trustees voted to change the common name of the district, previously known as the Meridian School District, to West Ada School District. The official name, Joint School District No. 2, remains unchanged.

District information
The district has grown by more than 5,000 students in the last five years. West Ada School District schools range in enrollment from 300 to over 2,000 students. School buildings vary in age with the oldest being more than 50 years old.

In Ada County the district includes:
 All of: Avimor
 Most of: Meridian, Eagle, Star
 Portions of: Boise, Garden City, Kuna

The district extends into Canyon County, where it includes portions of Nampa and Star.

Governance 
The district is administered by a five-member Board of Trustees elected by voters residing within the district's boundaries. Each of the five trustees represent specific geographic zones in the district. They receive no salaries or benefits and are elected to a four-year term.

History

Timeline
1945 - School districts reorganized to reduce 1,082 school districts in Idaho to 301 districts.
1950 - District named "Class A School District No. 2."
1963 - The District’s name was officially changed to its current name, "Joint School District No. 2."
2005 - Total enrollment for the district reached over 30,000.
2007 - The district moved into its new offices, consolidating seven different office locations.
2014 - Colloquial name changed from "Meridian School District" to "West Ada School District."

High schools
There are currently 7 high schools and 6 alternative schools in the district, five of which are classified 5A by the Idaho High School Activities Association.

Boise
 Centennial High School - (1987)

Meridian
 Central Academy (Alternative)
 Idaho Fine Arts Academy
 Meridian Academy (Alternative)
 Meridian High School - (1904, 1975)
 Meridian Medical Arts Charter High School - (2003) (Alternative)
 Meridian Technical Charter High School - (1999) (Alternative)
 Mountain View High School - (2003)
 Owyhee High School - (2021)
 Renaissance High School- (2009) (Alternative)
 Rocky Mountain High School - (2008)

Eagle
 Eagle Academy (Alternative) 
 Eagle High School - (1995)
North Star Public Charter School (Alternative)

Middle schools
There are currently 7 middle schools & 2 alternatives in the district.

Star 
Star Middle School

Meridian
 Heritage Middle School (2007)
 Lewis & Clark Middle School
 Meridian Middle School (1904, 1975)
 Sawtooth Middle School
 Victory Middle School (2016)

Boise
 Lake Hazel Middle School (1977)
 Lowell Scott Middle School - (1972)

Eagle
 Eagle Middle School

Alternatives (Meridian)
 Crossroads Middle School
 Pathways Middle School

Elementary schools
There are currently 32 elementary schools in the district.

Meridian

Boise

Eagle
 Eagle Elementary School of the Arts
 Eagle Hills Elementary
 Galileo STEM Academy* 
 Seven Oaks Elementary

Star
 Star Elementary

*Galileo STEM Academy is both a middle school and an elementary school

References

External links
 

School districts in Idaho
Treasure Valley
Education in Ada County, Idaho
Meridian, Idaho
West Ada School District (Idaho)
School districts established in 1945
1945 establishments in Idaho